John O'Flynn (born 1936) is an Irish former Gaelic footballer. He played with club side Kilshannig, divisional side Avondhu and at inter-county level with the Cork senior football team.

Playing career

O'Flynn first enjoyed success as a Gaelic footballer as a member of the Mallow Vocational School team that won the Cork County Vocational Schools' Championship in 1952. He later lined out with Kilshannig and was part of the team that won the club's inaugural North Cork JAFC title in 1959, before winning a further three divisional titles in 1965, 1967 and 1968. O'Flynn also lined out with divisional side Avondhu and won a Cork SFC title in 1961.

O'Flynn's success at club level earned a call-up to the Cork junior football team in 1960. He was promoted to the senior team a year later and captained Cork in the 1962 Munster SFC. O'Flynn's four-year senior career featured four successive Munster SFC final defeats by Kerry, while he also earned selection with the Munster team in the Railway Cup. He ended his inter-county career by winning a Munster JFC medal in 1966.

Honours

Kilshannig
North Cork Junior A Football Championship: 1959, 1965, 1967, 1968

Avondhu
Cork Senior Football Championship: 1961

Cork
Munster Junior Football Championship: 1966

References

1936 births
Living people
Kilshannig Gaelic footballers
Avondhu Gaelic footballers
Cork inter-county Gaelic footballers
Munster inter-provincial Gaelic footballers